Ivan Campbell (29 October 1908 – 22 January 1962) was an Australian cricketer. He played two first-class matches for Western Australia in 1933/34.

References

External links
 

1908 births
1962 deaths
Australian cricketers
Western Australia cricketers
Cricketers from Perth, Western Australia